= Welch Hall (Rockefeller University) =

Building in Manhattan, New York

- Interactive map of the Welch Hall area

General information
- Location: Rockefeller University, New York City, United States
- Coordinates: 40°45′44.7″N 73°57′17.9″W

Welch Hall is a building on the Rockefeller University campus in Manhattan, New York City.
